Pooley Bridge is a village in the Eden District of the northwestern English county of Cumbria, within the traditional borders of Westmorland.

The village takes its name from a bridge over the River Eamont at the northern end of Ullswater.  The bridge, erected in 1764 and replacing an earlier bridge from the 16th century, collapsed on 6 December 2015 when Cumbria was hit by heavy flooding as a result of Storm Desmond. A temporary replacement bridge was opened on 20 March 2016. A new stainless steel bridge was lifted into place in May 2020, and opened in October 2020.

There is a pier from which ferries (known as the Ullswater 'Steamers') provide connections to Glenridding and Howtown. Pooley Bridge was formerly known as Pooley or Pool How meaning the hill by the pool or stream. The name Pool How was derived from the Old English word pollr plus the Old Norse  haugr meaning hill or mound.

Pooley is mostly situated in the civil parish of Barton and Pooley Bridge, of which it is the main settlement. The few houses on the northern or Cumberland side of the bridge are in Dacre parish. The village is popular with tourists, especially during the summer, and has several hotels, guest houses and camping sites.

References

External links 
   Cumbria County History Trust: Barton (nb: provisional research only - see Talk page)
Storm Desmond: Pooley Bridge collapses in Cumbria floods
Large Sunny Images of Pooley Bridge
Pictures of Pooley Bridge 
Lake District Walks - Pooley Bridge

Villages in Cumbria
Eden District
Westmorland